List of 2016 box office number-one films in Taipei. The data using  weekend three-day movie box office information。At present, there is no transparent calculation method for box office in Taiwan. Most of the time using Taipei movie box office as a multiple of opera.

The box office list
(Unit: Ten thousandNew Taiwan dollar)

See also 
 List of highest-grossing films in Taiwan

References

External links 

2016
Taipai
2016 in Taiwan